Brownsville is a ghost town in Jackson County, Illinois, United States.  

Brownsville, located close to a salt creek that empties into the Big Muddy River, is the former county seat of Jackson County. It is 3.25 miles due west of Murphysboro and 0.75 miles south of Illinois Route 149. It was moved when the courthouse and downtown burned to the ground in 1843, and the county seat was then moved to Murphysboro.

References 

Geography of Jackson County, Illinois
Ghost towns in Illinois
Southern Illinois
Former county seats in Illinois